Vasuki is a 1997 Indian Tamil-language comedy-drama film produced by G. V. Anandan on Anand Movie Land banner and  directed by Kasthuri Raja. The film stars Rajendra Prasad and Urvashi, and has music composed  by Ilaiyaraaja. It was released on 30 October 1997.

Plot

Vasuki (Urvashi) lives with her milkman brother Kabali (Janagaraj) and her sister-in-law Pachaiamma (Jayachitra) in a slum. One day, their relative Ramasamy (Visu) comes to their home with a huge amount of money, he asks them for a favor.

In the past, Ramasamy's daughter married the wealthy (Thalaivasal Vijay). Ramasamy was supposed to give a large dowry to the miser mother-in-law Parvatham (Latha), but he could not collect the money in time. So after the marriage, Parvatham started to torture his daughter, going so far as killing Ramasamy's pregnant daughter. Parvatham then arranged a second marriage for her son. Ramasamy finally got the money they asked but it was too late.

Ramasamy wants to take revenge on the cruel Parvatham with Vasuki's help. Vasuki and her family accept, Vasuki takes the name of Kodeeswari and they start to act as a rich family in front of Parvatham. Parvatham has a younger son Balu (Rajendra Prasad) and she wants him to marry rich bride, and Kodeeswari seems to be the perfect bride. Kodeeswari and Balu finally get married, thus Kodeeswari and her family turn Parvatham's life into hell on earth. What transpires next forms the rest of the story.

Cast

Rajendra Prasad as Balu
Urvashi as Vasuki / Kodeeswari
Visu as Ramasamy
Radha Ravi as Pakkiri
Janagaraj as Kabali
Ramji
Malaysia Vasudevan as Balu’s father
Latha as Parvatham
Jayachitra as Pachaiamma
Thalaivasal Vijay
Pandu as Police officer
Suresh Chakravarthy
Uthra
Kiran Moi
Shanmugasundari
Dubbing Janaki
Bayilvan Ranganathan
Pasi Narayanan
Thideer Kannaiah
Periya Karuppu Thevar
Chaplin Balu
Khushbu in a guest appearance

Production
The production studio Anand Movie Land, which produced the very successful Poomani in 1996, had taken up the serious issue of the dowry problem in their new production Vasuki. One of the leading stars in Telugu Cinema, Rajendra Prasad signed to play the lead role for the first time in Tamil cinema, Ilaiyaraaja composed the musical score and Kasthuri Raja was chosen to direct the film.

Soundtrack

The film score and the soundtrack were composed by Ilaiyaraaja. The soundtrack, released in 1997, features 6 tracks with lyrics written by Kasthuri Raja.

References

External links

1997 films
1990s Tamil-language films
Indian comedy-drama films
Films scored by Ilaiyaraaja
Films directed by Kasthuri Raja
1997 comedy-drama films